"The Air Conditioned Author" is the third television play episode of the first season of the Australian anthology television series Australian Playhouse. "The Air Conditioned Author" was written by Colin Free and directed by Henri Safran and originally aired on ABC on 2 May 1966.

Plot
A novelist, Nicholas Lovatt, becomes disillusioned when his publisher urges him to turn out stereotyped novels.

Cast
 Richard Meikle as Nicholas Lovatt
 Eric Reiman
 Willie Fennell
 Tony Ingersent
 Sue Walker

Reception
The Sydney Morning Herald called it "a comedy that missed because it lacked deft shaping".

The Age called it "shapeless, disconnected and bumpy".

See also
 List of television plays broadcast on Australian Broadcasting Corporation (1960s)

References

External links
 
 
 
 Complete script at National Archives of Australia

1966 television plays
1966 Australian television episodes
1960s Australian television plays
Australian Playhouse (season 1) episodes